Royalton may refer to:

Places
 Royalton, Illinois
 Royalton, Indiana
 Royalton, Kentucky
 Royalton, Minnesota
 Royalton, New York
 Royalton, Ohio
 Royalton, Pennsylvania
 Royalton, Vermont
 Royalton, Wisconsin, a town
 Royalton (community), Wisconsin, an unincorporated community
 Royalton Hotel in New York City
 Royalton Township (disambiguation)

Other
 Arnold Royalton, a character in the Speed Racer film adaptation and his company Royalton Industries

See also
 
Royalston, Massachusetts